Cagliarese or callaresito is the name of a series of coins minted at Cagliari (Sardinia).

The first Cagliarese, in billon and weighing 0.80 g, was issued by Ferdinand II of Aragon, for a value of two deniers. In the 16th century, under King Charles II, it became in copper.

After the cession of Sardinia to the House of Savoy, the Cagliarese was coined until 1813. Victor Amadeus II minted the 1 and 3 cagliaresi coins, in copper (1720). They sported the profile of the new King, and weighed 2.35 and 6.75 grams, respectively. Victor Amadeus' son, Charles Emmanuel II, added the Mezzo Cagliarese (-Cagliarese) also in copper.

After the reformation of 1754, a new Cagliarese in copper, with a weight of 2.34 g and a diameter of 18 mm, was issued.

Under Charles Emmanuel III (1796–1802) the cagliarese was not issued. Victor Emmanuel I issued a 3 cagliaresi coin, around 1813.

The cagliarese disappeared in 1821, when the Scudo (120 Cagliarese) was replaced by the Sardinian Lira, which was divided into 100 centesimi.

Equivalencies to other Sardinian denominations, in 1816 

 2 Denari to the Cagliarese
 6 Cagliarese to the Soldo
 30 Cagliarese to the Real
 120 Cagliarese to the Lira
 300 Cagliarese to the Scudo
 600 Cagliarese to the Doppietta

References 

Coins of Italy
Economy of Sardinia